Crisis in Clay is a studio album by the American avant-rock group 5uu's, which was released in 1997.

Track listing 
 "Comeuppance" (Kerman) – 3:48
 "Broadside Hits and Near Misses" (Kerman) – 2:21
 "The How-To's of Self Taught" (Kerman) – 3:40
 "Bought the Farm" (Kerman) – 4:19
 "Simply Agree" (Drake, Kerman) – 1:38
 "Goliath in the Sights" (Kerman) – 4:18
 "December" (Kerman) –2:55
 "Hunter Gatherer" (Kerman) – 3:30
 "What Price Virtue?" (Kerman) – 3:19
 "Darkened Doors" (Kerman) – 4:54
 "The Encounter" (Kerman) – 3:26
 "The Willful Suspension of Disbelief" (Kerman) – 3:41
 "Cirrus" (Kerman) – 3:38
 "Weaponry" (Kerman) – 1:11
 "Absolutely, Absolute" (Kerman) – 3:48
 "Ringing in the New Ear" (Kerman) – 0:42

Personnel 
 Bob Drake – bass, guitar, violin, vocals
 Dave Kerman – guitar, drums, keyboards
 Sanjay Kumar – keyboards, talking 
with
 Scott Brazieal – vibraphone
 Thomas Dimuzio – electronic sounds, computer editing

References 

5uu's albums
1997 albums
Recommended Records albums